People with disabilities are at greater risk of contracting COVID-19 and have higher rates of mortality than non-disabled populations. This is especially true for people with intellectual and developmental disabilities, individuals who reside in care facilities, and women with disabilities. People with disabilities are at greater risk of experiencing mental health issues related to the pandemic, such as feelings of loneliness and isolation. They may be at greater risk of domestic violence and abuse during the pandemic. People with disabilities are more likely to experience unemployment as a result of the pandemic and may require changes to the types of accommodations they require for work. Children with disabilities are experiencing disruptions to their educational programming. Remote learning poses a host of challenges for children with disabilities, including disruptions to physical and occupational therapies and access to assistive technologies.

Risk of disease 

According to the World Health Organization (WHO), individuals with disabilities may be at higher risk for contraction of COVID-19. They may not be able to follow preventative measures, such as social distancing, as a result of support needs. Additionally, individuals may face barriers to accessing information about the pandemic, may be at higher risk due to preexisting conditions related to their disability, and may face disruptions to critical support services due to the pandemic. Persons with disabilities are over-represented in institutions such as nursing homes or other care facilities where COVID is more likely to spread. Persons with intellectual and developmental disabilities are also over-represented in correction and other types of detention facilities where COVID is known to spread more easily.

Globally, it is estimated that between 19% and 72% of COVID-related deaths have taken place in care facilities where persons with disabilities are over-represented. According to United Nations (UN) estimates, roughly 46% of individuals aged 60 or older have a disability worldwide, and about 80% of the world's disabled population lives in developing countries where access to health care is more limited.

In the face of resource shortages and overwhelmed health systems, several entities, such as the World Health Organization (WHO), the UN, and UNICEF, have expressed concern over the access of disabled persons to medical treatment for COVID-related disease and illness. Several disability rights entities have expressed concern over medical rationing during the pandemic and have argued that such measures are ableist and discriminatory toward individuals with disabilities. The vast majority of health care providers in the United States cannot use disability as grounds to ration care as outlined both in the ADA and Affordable Care Act (ACA). In response to these concerns, the Office for Civil Rights in the United States issued a bulletin at the end of March asserting that medical rationing measures cannot discriminate against people with disabilities and other protected groups.

Based on figures issued by the Office for National Statistics, from March through May 2020, disabled persons made up roughly 2/3 of all of the UK's COVID-related deaths. The report also concluded that disabled women were eleven times more likely than their non-disabled counterparts to die of complications from COVID. Disabled men were 6.5 times more likely to die of COVID-related illness than their nondisabled counterparts. People with intellectual and developmental disabilities are at particularly high risk for contracting and dying from COVID. According to initial data from the United States, people with intellectual disabilities are four times more likely to contract COVID and twice as likely to die from the disease.

Impact

Social 

Previous research on pandemics has indicated that people with disabilities are more vulnerable to a host of social and psychological issues. They are more likely to experience loneliness and isolation which may lead to other poor health outcomes. Women with disabilities and women who care for individuals with disabilities are at greater risk for domestic abuse and sexual violence during pandemics. They may also be unable to access reproductive care and may be more likely to experience socioeconomic disadvantages associated with the pandemic.

Children with disabilities are also at higher risk for mental distress as a result of the pandemic and may also be at greater risk of experiencing domestic violence during the COVID crisis. As of 2016, there were roughly 52 million children, age 5 and younger, with some form of developmental disability, and about 1 in 6 children in the United States, between ages 3–12, has a developmental disability. Children with intellectual and developmental disabilities, especially those with Autism Spectrum Disorder may be more likely to experience anxiety, stress, and other ill effects resulting from the pandemic. They may be particularly sensitive to changes in their daily routines, such as school closures. Children with disabilities are at higher risk of contracting COVID-19 and developing serious complications from the disease. They may not be able to adequately socially distance while interacting with others or may not be able to wear masks due to sensory issues. This may lead to further isolation both for disabled children and their families.

The rise of virtual gatherings has allowed some people with disabilities to participate in activities that were previously difficult to attend. For example, individuals with certain physical disabilities do not need to worry about whether a location is wheelchair-accessible when the event is conducted fully online.

Employment 

In the United States, According to the Equal Employment Opportunity Commission, employers must follow guidelines set out by the Americans with Disabilities Act (ADA) with consideration to COVID-19. This means that employers must keep all medical information they gather from employees related to COVID prevention confidential. They must continue to offer individuals with disabilities reasonable accommodations as well as take into consideration the accommodation requests made by individuals at higher risk for contracting more serious cases of COVID-19, such as individuals who are 65 years or older and those with preexisting conditions. Employers may have to renegotiate reasonable accommodations for individuals with disabilities based on the changes to work environments brought about by the pandemic, such as the prevalence of remote work. In some respects the expansion of "work from home" arrangements in many businesses  has actually improved employment opportunities for disabled people.

According to the UN, individuals with disabilities are more likely to lose their jobs as a result of the pandemic and face more difficulty in returning to work during the recovery period. Individuals with longterm effects of COVID, such as chronic fatigue, may also face employment challenges.

Education 

As of April, 2020, schools had ceased in-person operation in 189 countries, affecting roughly 1.5 billion children worldwide. Children with disabilities have faced a host of challenges related to remote learning. They have faced disruptions to the services they require as laid out in their Individualized Education Programs (IEP) and have struggled with many of the technologies used to carry out remote learning. Many types of assistive technologies, such as screen readers for the blind, are not compatible with the software platforms being used for remote learning. Children with disabilities often require in-person assistance, such as various physical and occupational therapies, and most teachers are not trained in how to conduct education remotely for children with disabilities. Parents of disabled children are also struggling as they are being asked to provide many of the services their children receive in schools without the training or expertise to do so. Parents of children with disabilities are also concerned about the risks involved in their children returning to school. Children with disabilities are more likely to have other health conditions that increase their risk of COVID-related complications.

Covid-19 Vaccine Access Issues for Disabled People 
For disabled individuals, COVID-19 vaccine distributions have raised some concern. In many westernized countries, such as the U.S., Canada, Australia, and across Europe, the vaccine rollouts have been uneven, exposing and exacerbating the inequities disabled individuals face. Despite disabled people being more willing to be vaccinated than those without disabilities, they have been vaccinated at lower rates. This vaccination-rate discrepancy likely grew from non-standardized vaccine rollouts; in the United States, for example, each state was allowed to differently implement the vaccine guidelines put forth by the Centers for Disease Control and Prevention (CDC). Similarly, in Europe and Canada there were no specific guidelines in place that provided accommodations to disabled individuals. This lack of standardization and accommodation left many disabled individuals behind, unable to get the vaccine regardless of desire.

A recent investigation into vaccine access in the United States conducted by the CDC cites access difficulties as one of the main reasons why disabled individuals are vaccinated at lower rates than the rest of the population. For example, many disabled individuals cite having trouble either getting to a vaccination location or making online appointments as one of the reasons why they have not yet been vaccinated. To overcome these obstacles, the CDC has issued a set of guidelines with regard to vaccine distribution to disabled individuals. These guidelines outline changes that vaccine locations should make such as making instruction and information available in American Sign Language (ASL) and in braille. Europe has also established similar guidelines.

See also
 Disability and disasters

References 

disabilities
Disability
Impact of the COVID-19 pandemic on other health issues